Robert of Strathearn (died c. 1244) was the 4th Earl of Strathearn in Scotland.

Robert was the fourth son of Gille Brigte of Strathearn and his wife Matilda. He first appears on record in 1199, when he and his brothers were witnesses to their father's charters to the Abbey of Inchaffray. By 1210, all three of his elder brothers had died, and he became heir to the earldom of Strathearn. In 1219 he confirmed as heir-apparent all his father's grants to the abbey, and after his accession as earl around 1223, he made a vow never to disturb the monks in their possessions.

Aside from his taking part in the abbey's affairs, he appears in a wider sphere in 1237, when he travelled to York with King Alexander, to negotiate the Treaty of York with Henry III of England.

Earl Robert died before April 1244.

Marriage and progeny
Earl Robert's wife was named Matilda (1178-1247). They had three sons and two daughters:

 Malise II of Strathearn, who succeeded as Earl
 Hugh, who became a friar and died c. 1290
 Gille Brigte/Gilbert, who acquired the lands of Durie and Belnollo in Fife, become the progenitor of the Duries 
 Annabella, who married firstly John of Restalrig, and secondly Sir Patrick Graham of Kincardine, who was killed at the Battle of Dunbar
 Mary, married Sir John Johnstone
 Matilda/Maud, who married Alexander, Earl of Menteith

References

Bibliography
Neville, Cynthia J., Native Lordship in Medieval Scotland: The Earldoms of Strathearn and Lennox, c. 1140-1365, (Portland & Dublin, 2005)
Paul, James Balfour, Sir, "The Scots Peerage" (Edinburgh : D. Douglas 1911), vol. VIII, pp. 244–245

1244 deaths
People from Perth and Kinross
Year of birth unknown
Mormaers of Strathearn
13th-century mormaers